"Stranger" is a song by Australian electronic music duo Peking Duk featuring Swedish singer Elliphant.

The song was written late in 2015 in Sydney while Elliphant was touring for the Falls Festival. The song was redone by the trio several times over the year. Elliphant is grateful the duo ignored her request "to give it to another artist", saying "I told them that maybe there would be a better person to do 'Stranger' because they weren't satisfied, I wasn't coming up with the vocal they wanted. If I heard it out there with some other girl now I would be so annoyed."

At the ARIA Music Awards of 2017, the song was nominated for three awards, winning ARIA Award for Song of the Year. At the APRA Music Awards of 2018, the song won Dance Work of the Year.

Track listing

Charts

Weekly charts

Year-end charts

Certifications

References

2016 singles
2015 songs
Peking Duk songs
ARIA Award-winning songs
APRA Award winners
Elliphant songs
Sony Music Australia singles
Songs written by Elliphant